John Collins Hanscomb CBE (7 October 1924 – 14 February 2019) was a British Conservative politician from the Metropolitan Borough of Bolton in Greater Manchester, England.

Early life and family
Born in Bolton, he was educated at Bolton School, and Oundle School near Peterborough. After leaving school he served as a fighter pilot in the Royal Air Force until 1953. He graduated from Emmanuel College, Cambridge with an M.A. degree in modern languages. He married twice, firstly Joan Ryder at Christ Church, Heaton in 1950, and secondly Norma Gibbons at Bolton Register Office in 1976. His son, Dr Nicholas Hanscomb, a scientist who helped to develop DNA testing, was murdered after attending Notting Hill Carnival in 1991, aged 38.

Political career
Hanscomb was first elected as a Councillor for the Heaton Ward in the County Borough of Bolton in 1964. He became the Leader of the Conservative group and the Council Leader in 1972.

Following the provisions of the Local Government Act 1972, the County Borough was amalgamated with other local authorities to form the Metropolitan Borough of Bolton and Hanscomb became a Councillor for the Deane-cum-Heaton Ward. At the same time, he became the Chairman of the new local authority in 1973 and transitional Mayor of Bolton the following year.

After the 1980 local elections, he resigned as the Leader of Bolton Council, but continued as the Leader of the Conservative group. He was awarded a Commander of the Order of the British Empire (C.B.E.) in December 1980. In 1982, he became the ceremonial Mayor of Bolton, with his wife, Norma, as Mayoress.

He stood down as Leader of the Conservative group in 1994, and retired as Councillor for the Deane-cum-Heaton Ward when boundary changes took place in 2004. Hanscomb died in February 2019 at the age of 94.

References

1924 births
2019 deaths
Alumni of Emmanuel College, Cambridge
Commanders of the Order of the British Empire
Conservative Party (UK) councillors
Conservative Party (UK) mayors
Councillors in Bolton
Mayors of Bolton
People educated at Bolton School
People educated at Oundle School
People from Bolton
Royal Air Force personnel
Leaders of local authorities of England
Military personnel from Lancashire